Indy Eleven are an American professional football club based in Indianapolis. 

This list encompasses the major records set by the club and their players in both the North American Soccer League (2014–2017) and USL Championship (2018–present).

Player records

Appearances

Bold denotes players still playing for the club.

Goals

Bold denotes players still playing for the club.

Managerial records

 Includes USL Regular Season, USL Playoffs, U.S. Open Cup. Excludes friendlies.

Notes:

References

External links

Indy Eleven
Indy Eleven
Indy Eleven records and statistics